Telyakey-Kubovo (Teläkäy-Qobaw) is a rural locality (a village) in Kanly-Turkeyevsky Selsoviet, Buzdyaksky District, Bashkortostan, Russia. The population was 44 as of 2010. There are 3 streets.

Geography 
Telyakey-Kubovo is located 26 km southwest of Buzdyak (the district's administrative centre) by road. Kazaklar-Kubovo is the nearest rural locality.

References 

Rural localities in Buzdyaksky District